The Ten Wings ( shí yì) is a  collection of commentaries ( zhuan) to the classical Chinese Book of Changes ( Yì jīng) traditionally ascribed to Confucius.

 Tuan zhuan, or Commentary on the Judgment, the 1st 
Tuan zhuan, the 2nd 
 Xiang zhuan, "Overall Image", the 1st  (sometimes called Great Xiang )
 Xiang, the 2nd  (aka Lesser Xiang or Little Images )
 Xici zhuan, the Commentary on the Appended Phrases, the 1st  
Xici zhuan, the 2nd  (the two Xi Ci are also called the Great Commentary , to emphasize their importance)
 Wenyan zhuan, Commentary on the Words
 Xugua zhuan, the Sequence of the Hexagrams
 Shuogua zhuan, the Explanation of the Trigrams
 Zagua zhuan, the Assorted or Miscellaneous Hexagrams

Doubts concerning Confucius' authorship of the Wings were expressed by Ouyang Xiu (1007-1072) and Sima Guang (1019-1086) during the Northern Song dynasty. The 20th-century sinologists provide argumentation for rejection of the traditional creed.

References

I Ching